Rawwadid or Ravvadid (also Revend or Revendi) or Banū Rawwād (955–1071) was a Sunni Muslim Kurdish dynasty, centered in the northwestern region of Adharbayjan (Azerbaijan) between the late 8th and early 13th centuries.

Originally of Azdi Arab descent, the Rawadids ruled Tabriz and northeastern Adharbayjan in the late 8th and early 9th centuries. The family became Kurdicized by the early 10th century and became centered on Tabriz and Maragha. In the second half of the 10th century and much of the 11th century, these Kurdified descendants controlled much of Adharbayjan as well as parts of Armenia.

History
The origin of the Rawwadid dynasty was connected with the name of the tribal leader Rawwad. Rawadids were originally from Azdi Arab ancestry, and arrived in the region in the mid 8th century, but they had become Kurdicized by the early 10th century and began to use Kurdish forms like Mamlan for Muhammad and Ahmadil for Ahmad as their names. The Rawadid family moved into Kurdistan in the mid 8th century, and it took over a leadership of the Rawadiya a branch of Hadhabani Kurdish tribe by the tenth century. In the second half of the 10th century and much of the 11th century, these Kurdicized descendants controlled much of Adharbayjan as well as parts of Armenia.

The earliest form of the name is written "Rewend" in the Sharafnameh. According to Kasravi, Rawwadids conquered the lands of the Musafirid ruler Ibrahim I ibn Marzuban I, in Adharbayjan in 979. Abu Mansur Wahsudan (1019-1054) is the best known Rawwadid ruler, and he is mentioned by Ibn Athir. According to Ahmad Kasravi, sixty panegyric qasidas of the poet Qatran Tabrizi (11th century) dedicated to Wahsudan have been preserved. After the Oghuz revolt against Mahmud Ghaznavi (998-1030) in Khorasan in 1028, about 2,000 Oghuz families fled to the West. Wahsudan protected and allowed some of them to settle in the territory of the Rawwadis. He gave them land and made them vassals, intending to use them in the wars against the Byzantine Empire. The regions of Tabriz, Maragha and the strongholds of Sahand mountain were in his possession. In 1029, he helped the Hadhbani Kurds in Maragha to defeat the invading Oghuz Turkish tribes.

According to Ibn Athir, Wahsudan formed a marriage alliance with the first group of Oghuz Turks reached Adharbayjan to act against his enemies. This alliance stimulated animosity of the Shaddadid ruler Abu’l-Ḥasan Laškari. Another group of Turks arrived in Adharbayjan in 1037–1038. After they looted Maragha, Wahsudan and his nephew Abu’l-Hayjā put aside their problems and joined forces against the Ghuzz Turks. Turks were dispelled to Rayy, Isfahan, and Hamadan. A group of Turks remained in Urmiya. Wahsudan invited their leaders to a dinner and slaughtered them in 1040–1041.

Qatran mentioned about several battles between Wahsudan and a group of a Ghuzz reached Adharbayjan in 1041–1042. An intense battle in the desert of Sarāb resulted in the Rawwadids’ defeat on the Turks.

After banishing the Oghuz, Wahsudan improved relations with Shaddadids and travelled in person to Ganja, center of Shaddadids.

Wahsudan also sent an expedition to Ardabil under the command of his son Mamlan II. The ruler (sipahbod) of Moghan had to submit to the conqueror. Mamlan also built a fortress in Ardabil.

A devastating earthquake in 1042-1043 destroyed much of Tabriz, its walls, houses, markets, and much of the Ravvadis' palace. Although Ibn al-'Asir said that 50,000 people died in Tabriz, Nasir Khosrow, who passed through Tabriz four years later gave the number of dead 40,000 and stated that the city was prospering at the times of his visit. Wahsudan himself was saved because he was in a garden outside the city.

The Seljuks under Tughril conquered the principality in 1054 CE, and he defeated the prince of Tabriz Wahsudan ibn Mamlan and brought his son Abu Nasr Mamlan. In 1071, when Alp Arslan returned from his campaign against the Byzantine Empire, he deposed Mamlan. Wahsudan's successor, Ahmad bin Wahsudan, lord of Maragha, took part in Malik Shah's campaign against Syria in 1110 CE. His full title was Ahmadil bin Ibrahim bin Wahsudan al-Rawwadi al-Kurdi.
Ahmadil fought again the crusaders during the First Crusade. Joscelin made a peace treaty with him during the siege of Tell Bashir (in present-day southern Turkey, south-east of Gaziantep). He was stabbed to death by the Ismaili assassins in 1117 in Baghdad. His descendants continued to rule Maragha and Tabriz as Atabakane Maragha until the Mongol invasion in 1227.

Rawadid Rulers
Muhammad ibn Husayn al-Rawadi (? – c. 953?)
Abu'l-Hayja Husayn I (955–988)
Abu'l-Hayja Mamlan I (988–1000)
Abu Nasr Husayn II (1000–1025)
Abu Mansur Wahsudan (1025–1058/9)
Abu Nasr Mamlan II (1058/9–1070)
Ahmadil ibn Ibrahim ibn Wahsudan (in Maragha)(c.1100-1116)

Burial Place 
Imamzadeh Chaharmenar in Tabriz, is the burial place of Rawadid Rulers:

See also
List of Sunni Muslim dynasties
List of Kurdish dynasties and countries

References

Sources

External links
Rawwadids, Encyclopaedia of Islam.
 A Chronology of World Political History(801 - 1000 C.E.)(see Rawwadid)
List of Rawadid Rulers

 
955 establishments
1116 disestablishments
States and territories established in the 950s
States and territories disestablished in the 1110s
Royal families of Armenia
Medieval Iranian Azerbaijan
10th century in Armenia
11th century in Armenia
Arab dynasties
Kurdish dynasties
History of the Kurdish people
History of Talysh
Sunni dynasties
Azd